Allison Ann Giles, who performed as Allison Ann Durbin (born 24 May 1950), is a former New Zealand Australian singer, known for her success in the late 1960s and 1970s as the "Queen of Pop". Durbin's visual trademark at that time was her lustrous waist-length auburn hair. She is a relative of Canadian-born actress and lyric soprano Deanna Durbin.

Biography

Allison Ann Durbin was born in 1950 in Auckland to Owen Durbin (born c. 1912/1913) and Agnes Durbin, the second eldest of seven children. She attended school at Westlake High School, and performed for four-years in a children's choir. She became interested in singing and was inspired by artists like Aretha Franklin, Nina Simone and Dionne Warwick, and began performing in public in her early teens.

After winning a talent contest at an Auckland ballroom, she was signed to Eldred Stebbing's Zodiac Records at the age of 14 and issued a number of singles. Her third Zodiac single, a cover of Herman's Hermits "Can't You Hear My Heartbeat", out-sold the original in New Zealand and became her first charted hit. She built up a following in New Zealand, recording and fronting the Mike Perjanik Group and travelled with them to Australia in 1966 for residencies in Sydney. After nine months in Sydney, she left the group to pursue a solo career, making numerous appearances on Australian TV pop and variety shows.

Durbin's first single for New Zealand HMV, "I Have Loved Me a Man", (a cover version of the song by Morgana King) became a No. 1 hit in New Zealand and also a hit in Australia. The song won her a New Zealand music award, 1968 Loxene Golden Disc, and she was named New Zealand Entertainer of the Year in 1969. For three years running (1969, 1970 and 1971), she won Australia's King of Pop Award for Best Female Artist, commonly called the "Queen of Pop". In 1971, she recorded a duet album, Together, with Johnny Farnham, who had been voted Australia's "King of Pop" during the same years Durbin received her awards.

Personal life

In the late 1960s, Durbin began a relationship with expatriate New Zealand record producer Howard Gable, then a senior A&R manager and in-house producer for EMI Australia. They married in 1969 and started a family. During the 1970s, as her career waned, Durbin began using heroin and her marriage to Gable ended. In 1985, she publicly acknowledged her battle with drugs and sought treatment at Odyssey House, a drug rehabilitation centre, but she was struck by a car two days after leaving the centre, which left her with serious injuries, including a broken jaw. After she recovered, she worked as a country music singer in the late 1980s. In 1986, she married for a second time to Ray Giles.

On 1 June 2007, under her married name Allison Giles, she was sentenced to 12 months' jail for cannabis trafficking. One of her co-accused, Giuseppe "Joe" Barbaro, whom she allegedly supplied with marijuana was a previously convicted drug dealer.

TELEVISION

Discography

Studio albums

Charting singles

Awards and nominations

Go-Set Pop Poll
The Go-Set Pop Poll was coordinated by teen-oriented pop music newspaper, Go-Set and was established in February 1966 and conducted an annual poll during 1966 to 1972 of its readers to determine the most popular personalities.

|-
| 1969
| herself
| Female Vocal
| style="background:gold;"| 1st
|-
| 1970
| herself
| Best Girl 
| style="background:gold;"| 1st
|-
| 1971
| herself
| Best Girl Vocal
| style="background:gold;"| 1st
|-
| 1972
| herself
| Best Female Vocal
| style="background:silver;"| 2nd

King of Pop Awards
The King of Pop Awards were voted by the readers of TV Week. The King of Pop award started in 1967 and ran through to 1978.

|-
| 1969
| herself
| Best Female Artist
| 
|-
| 1970
| herself
| Best Female Artist
| 
|-
| rowspan="2"| 1971
| rowspan="2"| herself
| Best Female Artist
| 
|-
| Best Dressed Female Performer
| 

 Note: Durbin is often referred to as the 'Queen of Pop', but won Best Female Artist at the King of Pop Awards from 1969-71. The Queen of Pop award was introduced in 1972. In 2003, Durbin reiterated this saying, "I never in fact won a queen of pop award. The award was called The King of Pop awards."

Mo Awards
The Australian Entertainment Mo Awards (commonly known informally as the Mo Awards), were annual Australian entertainment industry awards. They recognise achievements in live entertainment in Australia from 1975 to 2016. Allison Durbin won two awards in that time.
 (wins only)
|-
| 1979
| Allison Durbin
| Country Female Entertainer of the Year
| 
|-
| 1980
| Allison Durbin
| Country Female of the Year
| 
|-

New Zealand Music Awards
The New Zealand Music Awards are an annual awards night celebrating excellence in New Zealand music and have been presented annually since 1965.

! 
|-
| 1968 || "I Have Loved Me a Man" || Most Promising Female ||  || 
|-

References

Works cited
 Noel McGrath's Australian Encyclopedia of Rock & Pop - Rigby Publishers - 1978
 The Who's Who of Australian Rock - Chris Spencer - Moonlight Publishing

External links

 Amplifier NZ Music
 Pop Archives Feature – "Don't Come any Closer"
 Pop Archives Feature – "Put Your Hand in the Hand"

1950 births
Living people
Australian women pop singers
New Zealand women pop singers
New Zealand emigrants to Australia
Australian cannabis traffickers
New Zealand drug traffickers
Singers from Melbourne